Betahaus is a coworking space in Berlin and was started in January 2009 by the six founders Tonia Welter, Gregor Scheppan, Stephan Bielefeldt, Madeleine von Mohl, Max von der Ahé and Christoph Fahle, the official opening in Berlin took place in April 2009. Thus, the Betahaus was a pioneer and the first under similar facilities in Berlin.

Locations 
Betahaus has locations in Sofia, Hamburg and Barcelona. Well-known start-ups that started here are, for example, Coffee Circle, Ezeep, GoEuro (Omio), car2go and Clue.

At the end of 2018, Betahaus moved from Prinzessinenstrasse in Berlin's Kreuzberg district to the old taz building in Rudi-Dutschke-Strasse in Berlin. The locations in Hamburg and Cologne had to file for bankruptcy. While the Cologne location was closed, the Hamburg location could be saved. Betahaus again filed for insolvency in 2021, a proposal that was approved by the court in Germany in December, 2021. This allows Betahaus to remain open even with debts to creditors and investors that will never be repaid.

Business Model 

The company generates 40 percent of its turnover through the workspaces it offers. 40 percent are taken with events and conferences and 20 percent with a public Café. An example of an event is the "Female-Founders-Breakfast", to which former minister for economy affairs Brigitte Zypries invited in 2014. In 2009, the Yes Men presented their film The Yes Men standing in a shopping cart in Betahaus as part of Berlinale.

References

External links 
Betahaus Official Website
Types of Coworking Spaces

Coworking space providers
Buildings and structures in Berlin